79912 Terrell, provisional designation , is a dark Adeonian asteroid from the central regions of the asteroid belt, approximately 6 kilometers in diameter. It was discovered on 10 February 1999, by astronomers Walter Cooney and Ethan Kandler at the Highland Road Park Observatory, in Baton Rouge, Louisiana, United States. The asteroid was named after American astrophysicist Dirk Terrell.

Orbit and classification 

Terrell is a member of the Adeona family, a large family of carbonaceous asteroids in the central main belt, named after 145 Adeona.

It orbits the Sun at a distance of 2.2–3.1 AU once every 4 years and 5 months (1,599 days). Its orbit has an eccentricity of 0.16 and an inclination of 11° with respect to the ecliptic.

Physical characteristics 

The asteroid's spectral type is unknown. Members of the Adeona family are typically carbonaceous C-type asteroids, which Terrells albedo (see below) agrees with.

Diameter and albedo 

According to the survey carried out by the NEOWISE mission of NASA's Wide-field Infrared Survey Explorer, Terrell measures 6.340 kilometers in diameter and its surface has a low albedo of 0.053.

Rotation period 

As of 2017, no rotational lightcurve of Terrell has been obtained from photometric observations. The asteroid's rotation period, poles and shape remain unknown.

Naming 

This minor planet was named after American Dirk Terrell (born 1965), an astrophysicist, writer, space artist, and mentor of amateur astronomers. The official naming citation was published by the Minor Planet Center on 18 September 2005.

References

External links 
 Asteroid Lightcurve Database (LCDB), query form (info )
 Dictionary of Minor Planet Names, Google books
 Asteroids and comets rotation curves, CdR – Observatoire de Genève, Raoul Behrend
 Discovery Circumstances: Numbered Minor Planets (75001)-(80000) – Minor Planet Center
 
 

079912
Discoveries by Walter R. Cooney Jr.
Discoveries by Ethan Kandler
Named minor planets
19990210